Roma is a rural town and locality in the Maranoa Region, Queensland, Australia. It is the administrative centre of the Maranoa Region. The town was incorporated in 1867 and is named after Lady Diamantina Bowen (née di Roma), the wife of Sir George Bowen, the Governor of Queensland at the time.

Geography

Roma is in the Maranoa district of South West Queensland, Australia, situated  

  by rail and road WNW of Brisbane
 355 km (221 mi) W of Toowoomba,
 269 km (167 mi) W of Dalby
 141 km (87.6 mi) W of Miles
 87 km (54 mi) E of Mitchell
 176.6 km (109.7 mi) E of Morven
 266 km (165 mi) E of Charleville

It is situated at the junction of the Warrego and Carnarvon highways. It is the centre of a rich pastoral and wheat-growing district. It is also a major town on the Western Railway Line from Toowoomba and Brisbane.

History

Prior the European settlement the Aboriginal peoples of the Mandandanji Nation occupied this region. Mandandanji (also known as Mandandanyi, Mandandanjdji, Kogai) is an Australian Aboriginal language spoken by the Mandandanji people. The Mandandanji language region is within the local government boundaries of the Maranoa Region, particularly Roma, Yuleba and Surat, then east towards Chinchilla and south-west towards Mitchell and St George.

Roma was named after Lady Diamantina Bowen (Contessa Diamantina di Roma), wife of the first Governor of Queensland, George Bowen.

In 1863 Samuel Symons Bassett brought Queensland's vine cuttings to Roma and established the Romavilla Winery in 1866 on Bungil Creek north of Roma.

In 1864 Reverend Adam McIntyre of the Free Church of Scotland commenced services at pastoral stations in the Maranoa district with the intention that he would be established as a permanent minister in Roma. However, on 22 May 1866 he died at Brucedale pastoral station on Bungil Creek south-east of Roma, now in Tingun .

Captain Starlight, a cattle rustler, was tried and acquitted in the Roma Courthouse in February 1873. No successful conviction for cattle rustling has been made in Roma.

Roma State School, the first school in Roma, opened on 21 March 1870 and closed on 31 December 1986.

St John's School was established by the Sisters of Mercy in 1881.

Roma was the site of Australia's first oil and gas discoveries.

During World War II, Roma was the location of RAAF No.22 Inland Aircraft Fuel Depot (IAFD), completed in 1942 and closed on 29 August 1944. Usually consisting of 4 tanks, 31 fuel depots were built across Australia for the storage and supply of aircraft fuel for the RAAF and the US Army Air Forces at a total cost of £900,000 ($1,800,000).

Roma Special School opened on 25 January 1982 and closed on 31 December 1995.

In 2004, Roma had a low unemployment rate of 2.9%, which is among the lowest unemployment rates in Australia. 68.5% of the people in the labour force living in Roma were employed full-time, with 21.9% working on a part-time basis.

The Roma State College opened on 1 January 2006 as an amalgamation of Roma Junior School and Roma Middle School, and the addition of a new senior component.

In 2010, a Santos project study investigated the possibility of introducing treated CSG produce water into Roma's existing underground aquifer which supplies the town's water needs, including drinking water  The Roma Managed Aquifer Recharge Study is the first of its kind in Australia. It is also considered experimental in nature as the risks are largely unknown. The Roma CSG Field pilot trial (Hermitage) Stage 4 is in operation (Completed Q4 2012) and Roma CSG Field (The Bend) Stage 4 operation is due to commence Q3/Q4 2014. The project will allow for the injection of up to 24 ML/d of treated coal seam gas water into the Gubberamunda Sandstone aquifer for up to 20 years. Water bores have been shut down and hence been restarted at nearby Wallumbilla due to methane being detected in the Gubberamunda Sandstone aquifer (2014).

Heritage listings
Roma has a number of heritage-listed sites, including:
 75 Arthur Street: State Butchers Shop
 42 Bungil Street: Roma Government Complex (former Roma State School)
 38–44 Hawthorne Street: Hibernian Hall
 McDowall Street: Roma Court House and Police Buildings
 86 McDowell Street: Hunter's Emporium
 77 Northern Road: Romavilla Winery
 Warrego Highway, Bungeworgorai: Mount Abundance Homestead
 Wyndham Street: War Memorial and Heroes Avenue

Climate

Roma experiences a humid subtropical climate (Köppen: Cfa, Trewartha: Cfal); with hot summers with moderate rains; warm to hot, relatively dry springs and autumns; and mild, dry winters. Its location on the far south of the Carnarvon Range at an elevation of 299 metres above sea level means that it is cooler and wetter than the plains to the south and west, while being warmer and drier than areas to the north and east, and also receives enough precipitation to avoid being classified as a semi-arid climate.

Temperatures in Roma range from 34 °C in summer to 20 °C in winter and winter minimums can drop below freezing; however, it seldom gets colder than −3 °C. Rainfall is mild and distributed fairly evenly throughout the year, with an annual average of 587.9 mm (23.15 in), however it peaks in summer due to frequent showers and thunderstorms. Roma is usually too far inland to experience the influence of tropical cyclones and monsoonal rain depressions, however there are exceptions, and these systems have caused significant flooding in the town.

Extremes have ranged from 45.8 °C (115.2 °F) to −5.8 °C (23.4 °F).

Flooding
The town is situated on Bungil Creek, a tributary of the Condamine River. In March 2010, Roma experienced its worst floods in over 100 years.  Flooding also occurred in April 2011, a year of record rainfall in Roma. In early February 2012, Roma was devastated by its worst floods in history, eclipsing the level reached in 2010; 444 homes were inundated, twice as many that were flooded in the two previous years.

Having experienced three successive years of flooding, in May 2012, one insurer, Suncorp, announced it would not issue new policies to Roma residents, unless action was taken to mitigate the flood risk in Roma.

Industry and economy
Roma is the major provisional centre for the Maranoa District, South West Queensland for government and industry business. It is on the western fringe of the Surat Basin energy / resources boom.

Agriculture
The Maranoa's agriculture industry is worth approximately $620 million annually, 64.3% being generated from crops. 58.7% of businesses in the Maranoa are in the agriculture, forestry and fishing sector, which employs 32.7% of the region's workforce. 2005 was a record year for Roma saleyards processing 390,000 head of cattle. Roma is home to the largest store cattle saleyards in the Southern Hemisphere. Saledays are Tuesday (for the big sales) and Thursday (for the fat cattle)  Forestry plantations include Hardwood and Cypress Pines. Roma and the Maranoa region is home to Australia's most active native Cypress Pine sawmilling.

Oil and Gas
In 1906 natural gas was used for lighting in Roma. The industry has expanded as more reserves were discovered.

Origin Energy is proposing Spring Gully Power Station as an $870 Million, 1,000 MW power station that will provide electricity to South-East Queensland.  With a base at the Spring Gully CSG site, the power station will have the benefit of being close to the source of gas and able to use the waste-water left over from the other CSG operations.

Santos GLNG is developing CSG fields in the district and is undertaking the project on behalf of a joint venture arrangement with Santos Limited, Petroliam Nasional Berhad, TotalEnergies and Korea Gas Corporation. The projects are spatially intensive and include production and monitoring wells, underground gas storage, injection wells, fixed above-ground gas field facilities, water management infrastructure, and above and below-ground gas and water pipelines.

Water
Bore water for the town is obtained from the Artesian Basin.

Media
Various LPON Narrowcast Services are also available on on 87.6 FM (United Christian Broadcasters) 88.0 FM (R FM) 87.8 FM (Switch Gold) with 95.9 FM (Switch FM) also available on higher power around the town's CBD.
 
4ZR is Roma's local radio station, broadcasting on 1476 AM. It is operated by Resonate Broadcasting who also operates 4VL in Charleville and 4LG in Longreach. 

Hit 95.1 Maranoa (part of the Southern Cross Austereo - operated Hit Radio Network) is Roma's main FM Radio Station, broadcasting on 95.1 FM   

The Western Star is Roma's local newspaper.

ABQ transmits to Roma through its relay station ABRAQ-2 at 26°34′20″S 148°51′1″E (Timbury Hills Transmitter site).

Network Ten and its sister channels 10 Bold and 10 Peach transmits to Roma through its regional area affiliate, CDT.

The Nine Network and its sister channels 9Go! and 9Gem transmits to Roma through its regional area affiliate, IMP.

The Seven Network and its sister channels 7two and 7mate transmits to Roma through its remote area affiliate, ITQ.

The Special Broadcasting Service and its sister channels transmits to Roma.

Education
Roma State College is a government primary and secondary (Early Childhood-12) school for boys and girls.  In 2017, the school had an enrolment of 871 students (including students from Wallumbilla, Yuleba, Muckadilla, Amby and Surat) with 86 teachers (76 full-time equivalent) and 59 non-teaching staff (45 full-time equivalent). The college operates from three separate campuses:

 Junior Campus at 28 Bowen Street
 Middle Campus at Cottell Street
 Senior Campus at Timbury Street

A special education program (certified through the National Disability Insurance Scheme) embracing the full range of disabilities is available at all three campuses.

St John's School is a Roman Catholic primary and secondary (Prep-12) school for boys and girls at Bowen Street. In 2017, the school had an enrolment of 697 students with  61 teachers (55 full-time equivalent) and 27 non-teaching staff (19 full-time equivalent).

Amenities 

Hotels, pubs, and churches feature prominently near the centre of town. The ten hotels are within easy walking distance with most adjacent to another hotel.

St Paul's Anglican Church which is part of the Anglican Diocese of Brisbane, is a copy of a 13th Century English Church in the shape of crucifix.

Roma Uniting Church is at 48-50 Bungil Road. The Roma Lutheran congregation holds their services at the Uniting Church.

The Roma Public Library is situated with the Roma Community Arts Centre located at 38-44 Hawthorne Street and is part of the Maranoa Regional Council Library Service.  The Maranoa Regional Council Library Service is part of the Rural Libraries Queensland service with online resources and library collections found at the Rural Libraries Queensland website.  Public WiFi is provided via a ISDN High Speed Internet Connection to Brisbane (powered through the National Broadband Network).

The Roma branch of the Queensland Country Women's Association has its rooms at 57 Arthur Street.

The town is well serviced by four Caravan Parks, the Villa Holiday Park, the Big Rig Tourist Park, the Roma Clay Target Club Caravan Park, and the Ups N Downs Caravan Park.

The Roma Airport has regular flights from Brisbane.

Roma has a range other facilities open to the general public. These include a swimming pool, golf course, bowling green, Bassett Park showground, visitor information centre and a number of sporting clubs and civic facilities.

Sport 
'Cities' is a rugby league team that plays in the Roma and District rugby league football competition. Both their B grade and A grade sides recently enjoy back to back premierships with the a grade side winning undefeated in 2017, Darren Lockyer was once captain of this team, and it was in this team that he was then scouted for the Brisbane Broncos. The 'Roma Tomatoes' mixed-gender Touch Rugby team was founded in 2009.

Roma has a rugby union team which compete in the Darling Downs Rugby Union competition, against such teams as the University of Southern Queensland Rugby Union Club, Toowoomba Rangers Rugby Union Club, Toowoomba City Rugby Club, Roma Echidnas, the Condamine Cods, the Dalby Wheatmen, the Goondiwindi Emus, the Warwick Water Rats and the University of Queensland Rugby Union Club (Gatton Campus).

Attractions 
Local tourist attractions include the Big Rig and Oil and Gas Museum, Romavilla Winery and Roma Saleyards.  The winery is the oldest in Queensland.

Roma is also known for its bottle trees. With a girth of 9.51 metres, one specific bottle in Edwardes Street is promoted as one of Roma's tourist attractions.

Events 
Since 1977, Roma has hosted an annual 'Easter in the Country' event.

The annual Roma Show is held in May.

Notable people 

 Samuel Symons Bassett, established the Romavilla Winery
 Arthur Beetson, Australian rugby league captain and an "Immortal"
 Willie Carne, Australian rugby league international
 Albert Fuller Ellis, phosphate prospector
 Malcolm Farr, Political journalist and commentator
 Wally Fullerton-Smith, Australian rugby league international
 Arthur 'Nat' Gould, military aviator
 A. M. Hertzberg, businessman and mayor
 Ray Higgs, Australian rugby league international
 Patrick Holland, novelist
 Darren Lockyer, Australian rugby league legend. Three - Time NRL Premiership winning Captain of the Brisbane Broncos and Kangaroos captain
 Fabian "Fabe" McCarthy, Australian rugby union international
 Ray Meagher, actor, and amateur rugby player
 Wilson D. Miscamble, C.S.C., historian, professor at the University of Notre Dame
 Bruce Scott, politician
 Brent Tate, Australian rugby league international
 Robin Thorne, Australian rugby league player

See also

 Roma Airport
 Roma Power Station
 Hospital Hill fire

References

External links

 
 Town maps: east and west
 Queensland Natural Gas Transmission Pipelines (map)
 Queensland Gas Transmission and Distribution (government department of energy)
 

 
Maranoa Region
Populated places established in 1867
1867 establishments in Australia
Localities in Queensland